The 1977 Eastern Michigan Hurons football team represented Eastern Michigan University in the 1977 NCAA Division I football season. In their second and final season under head coach Ed Chlebek, the Hurons compiled an 8–3 record (4–3 against conference opponents), finished in fourth place in the Mid-American Conference, and outscored their opponents, 239 to 195. The team's statistical leaders included Steve Raklovits with 1,784 passing yards, Bobby Windom with 1,322 rushing yards, and James Hall with 646 receiving yards.

Schedule

References

Eastern Michigan
Eastern Michigan Eagles football seasons
Eastern Michigan Hurons football